Jonetani Ratu is a Fijian rugby union footballer. He plays inside centre for the Fiji Barbarians and Cagimaira. He is a powerful runner with the ability to bounce off tackles and has played an important role in contributing to Nadroga's success in the Premier division.

Career
Nadroga won the Telecom Fiji Cup and the Sullivan-Farebrother Trophy in 2004
Nadroga won the Colts competition in 1998.
In 2005-06, Nadroga BP Oil Provincial 7's, led by Ratu.

External links
 Profile of Jonetani Ratu

1977 births
Living people
Fijian rugby union players
Fiji international rugby union players
People from Sigatoka
I-Taukei Fijian people
Rugby union centres